Metasia profanalis is a moth in the family Crambidae. It was described by Francis Walker in 1866. It is found in the Democratic Republic of the Congo (Katanga), South Africa and Yemen.

References

Moths described in 1866
Metasia